Vasudev Vaman Shenoy (15 February 1940 – 9 March 2015), better known as V.V.Shenoy, was a notable Educationist, Educational Counsellor, Journalist and a Social Activist. He was also a plants enthusiast and very popular for the Panchavati Terrace Gardens that he developed on the terrace of his house frequented by several eminent personalities over the time. He is the Founder Director of Students' Information & Guidance Bureau, an institution recognised for educational counselling. solving unemployment problems and for supporting and encouraging students to pursue their educational programs for further employment and choice of career. V.V.Shenoy died on 9 March 2015 due to medical complications.

Early life

V. V. Shenoy was born on 15 Feb 1940 in Borkatte, Karkala Taluk, Karnataka. He did his initial schooling in a small village elementary school in Borkatte. Due to the poor financial conditions at home he got out at the very young age of 14 and ventured out in search of work. He then pursued his high school education at S.V.T. Higher Elementary School, St. Thomas High School, Honnavar and then Janata Vidyalaya, Dandeli, part by part, with the help of the finances he managed to earn through the chores he did at various places. He then came to Belgaum around the year 1963 to pursue his higher education and did his Bachelor of Science at R.L.S. College, Belgaum. He was known for his commanding and leadership qualities and always had a soft corner for all his fellow students and other people. Be it Academics, extracurricular activities, National Cadet Corps (India), representing the college or various other organizations and other social activities, he's known to excel in all. During his B.Sc education days, he had to support his family back in his hometown as well as look after his basic needs in Belgaum. This is when he saw and realized the amount of difficulties students faced at their peak age of career decision making and education attaining phase. He then pursued and successfully completed his Bachelor of Education in Belgaum as he believed that it would help him in understanding the students’ issues and the situation of the educational system. In the year 1968 he started (invented) a unique organization called Students' Information & Guidance Bureau .  This organization served (and still does) over 60 lac members/students by solving, guiding and helping them achieve their higher education and career choices. In the last ~40 years, he worked and served in innumerable organizations/fields mainly including Journalism, Horticulture and Kannada & Konkani Culture, Literature and Traditions. He always believed that it was not necessary to be a Politician, Minister or a Celebrity to be a social worker and work for the welfare of the people.

Students' Information & Guidance Bureau

Students' Information & Guidance Bureau or SIGB was founded by Vasudev V Shenoy in the year 1968. He was approx 28 years old when he started the institution. Located at Shanivar Khoot, Kakatives in Belgaum City, this Institution provides guidance, detailed information of various courses available at various universities, apprenticeship available at private industrial sectors, scholarships provided by various institutions, government job opportunities, detailed information of banking, LIC and other such examinations, competitive exams, engineering and medical education facilities, job opportunities available for the youth and many other such information in and around Belgaum city and North Karnataka. The institution also had a branch office at Tilakwadi, Belgaum for over 30 years which was later closed in 2006 as he preferred concentrating and personally attending to and devoting his time at one place at the head office. This Institution is not a Government run office, Employment Exchange, University Branch office/Agency or any other Institute but a private run Institution for the well-being of the students.
SIGB has further sub sections of functioning i.e. STUDENTS’ HELPLINE through which candidates pursue their U.G and P.G correspondence courses for a couple of Universities in Karnataka and STUDENTS’ BOOK BUREAU where the latest and current Job Opportunities in various sectors are managed for the candidates.

A separate division was started for providing special guidance to the youth and the underprivileged in 1981.
The then Education Minister G.B.Shankar Rao inaugurated this division and officially became the first member on that day.

V.V. Shenoy personally attended to and guided most of the students to attain information and achieve education in their particular preferred field of interest. A lot of poor or underprivileged students seeking help guidance or information, have gained much so that they could complete their education.  He had a wide range of sources from where he collected all the knowledge and information which he imparted onto the candidates. Important information/ news / ads reported in the various newspapers in various languages are compiled and made available on the notice board for the candidates’ perusal on a daily basis. Job opportunities list is made available to all the candidates on the notice board.

Guides, Books, Old/model question papers thousands of reference books and important education, commerce, science, current affairs etc. related documents, collected from over the last 30 years are made available for the candidates’ reference. This institution has helped and has had above 60 lakh members over the time.

Several personalities and notable persons have visited over the time and commended Shenoy’s unique venture and his desire to work for the society and students in particular. Few of them namely G.B. Shankar Rao, S. R. Nayak, Chairman of Law Commission of Karnataka, OmPrakash, D.G. & I.G.P, Karnataka State, P J Nayak, Deputy Commissioner, PS Ramanujan, S. V. JaishilRao, H. M. Nagaraja Rao, G. V.  Naik, Collector  Customs Central Excise, H. M. Nayak, R. Shankarappa, Divisional Commissioner, I. M. Vithalmurthy, Charuhasan, Advocate and Film artist etc. Also eminent Kannada writers like Krishnamoorthy Puranik, K. Shivaram Karanth, U. R. Ananthamurthy, Santosh Kumar Gulwadi, Vyasrai Ballal and many more have visited SIGB.

SIGB currently functions and looked after by Mrs. Aruna Vasudev Shenoy.

Panchavati Terrace Garden/ Horticulture Department

 
 
 
 
 
An interesting "laboratory" for students of the schools around, a pleasant spot for visitors to the house to chat in, a cool tension free retreat for the family to spend an evening in – this is what V.V. Shenoy has created on his modest terrace. In his own words, his garden is a combination of Duty and Beauty. When this duty is undertaken with an eye for beauty, the effort takes a marvelous shape, with vegetable and fruit trees, flowering plants, Crotons and herbs swaying happily in perfect harmony. The variety of plants and trees blending perfectly into a harmony of colors and shapes is bewilderingly wide that it needs the owner to introduce to some of the rare ones. In this garden the mighty Banyan tree stands side by side with the humble shoe flower plant, the common Tulsi, Neem, Bluebells, Jasmines and Roses.
The spicy Clove, Cardamom, Pepper, Jaiphal and Coffee, rub shoulders (or rather branches) with the fragrant Champa, Dreamy Rajnigandha, colourful Mayflower and prosaic Rubber and Coconut trees. All are planted in pots 22" and less in height! Even the spaces below the bigger trees like Jamun, Seedless Mangoes, Chickoo, Mosambi, Pomegranate, Areca nut, Lemon and Guavas are lined with useful herbs like Ajwain, Pudina, Coriander, Lemongrass, Brahmi and Betel Leaves. One can see fruits growing in the most unbelievable conditions like a Mango of the size of a complete human palm, growing on a tree/plant just 3 feet tall, pineapples growing in the pot, large sized pomegranates, lemons, button oranges, sugar lemons, and even 15" long ladies finger on a long slender plant. The garden also boasts of exotic plants like Strawberries, Annapurna (a long leafy plant which put in the cooker while making rice gives an aroma of Basmati rice), AloeVera, Wild Berries, White Jamun or the Jaam, Starfruit, Chayote, Stevia (a plant very famous for diabetes controlling and eradicating powers), Brahmakamal and many more 

The little green empire on the roof, making a mockery of the usual rough and rugged concrete terrace also mocks at the main misconception connected with gardening – that gardening is the monopoly of the aristocratic with sprawling acres, plenty of money to spend on manure, saplings and gardeners.
This garden is looked after by the family themselves without any professional gardener on duty which is a matter of pride and pleasure for them.  This also leads to another fascinating hobby of ornithology, because of the innumerable birds coming in, thanks to the flowers and fruits.

Natural manure consisting of household waste, dried leaves and flowers from the garden etc. is used in place of chemical and artificial manures. This does away with the problem of garbage disposal and also ill effects of chemical fertilizers are avoided. V. V. Shenoy followed the phrase “kasa dinda rasa” (best out of waste) very practically. It is not the availability of the water alone that is important but correct management. All the waste water from the kitchen etc. is diverted to the garden for the plants.
This terrace garden also serves as a natural air conditioner for the house controlling the temperature inside it. The natural conditions created within the pots are perhaps excellent guards against extremes of temperatures. Thus even seasonal fruits and vegetables are reaped almost throughout the year.

The accolades of distinguished visitors like the then Union Agriculture Minister Balram Jakhar, Mr. Suresh Angadi,  M.P, Bharatiya Janata Party . Dr. Vittal Rai, Vice-Chancellor of the Agriculture University, Dharwad, Dr. Beer Singh Chowdary,  President of the Bharat Krishika Samaj , U.T. Alwa,  Special Secretary to the Government of Karnataka, Forest Department Environment and Ecology  have added to the enthusiasm of the garden lover. 
The Shenoy family believes that if everybody follows this practice, of having at least a small group of plants, will keep the cities cool, green and above all healthy.

V.V. Shenoy has also worked as one of the Directors of the Horticulture Department, Belgaum. Flower and Fruit shows and exhibitions and competitions have been organized every year in Hume Park, Club Road, Belgaum, under the able guidance and active participation of V. V. Shenoy. He organized, conducted and managed to dedicatedly work for the research and development of plants even amidst his busy schedule involving his activities of his office.

Personal life 
V.V. Shenoy married Aruna, daughter of Smt. Rukmini & Shri. Laxman Prabhu,  Headmaster S.V.T. School , Karkala, in the year 1976. They have three children, Dr. Rashmi V. Shenoy, Chetan V. Shenoy and Anupkumar V. Shenoy.

Institutions And Organisations 
To quote, a few institutions and organisations in which he has put his heart and soul and worked hard for the welfare of the society at large, are as follows:
 Director, Students' Information & Guidance Bureau
 Founder President, Belgaum District Konkani Parishad, Belgaum.
 Member, Text Book Committee for Konkani Language in Karnataka State.
 Director, Kalasangam.
 Executive Member, All India Konkani Parishad, Panaji, Goa.
 Secretary, Belgaum Press Club, Belgaum.
 Secretary, Kanara Cultural Association.
 Vice-President, Consumer Organisation for Protection and Education (COPE), Belgaum.
 Founder Director, NORMCO, Belgaum.
 Founder Director, SPOCO, Sports School Chandargi, Belgaum.
 President, Terrace and Kitchen Garden Owners Association, Belgaum.
 Director, Sahitya Sampada, Belgaum.
 Director, Students’ Helpine, Belgaum.
 Ex General Secretary, Belgaum Dist. Kannada Sahitya Parishat, Belgaum.
 Patron, Kannada Sahitya Parishat, Bangalore.
 Life Member, Bharatiya Vidya Bhavan, Mumbai.
 Ex General Secretary, Bharatiya Vidya Bhavan, Belgaum Kendra. 
 Executive Member, Alumni Association, KLE Society's Raja Lakhamagouda Science Institute, Belgaum.
 Executive member, Ajanta Film Society, Belgaum
 Director, Board of Management, Belgaum Dist Horticulture Society,  Belgaum
 Member, Belgaum District Postal Forum, Belgaum.
 Twice General Secretary, All India Kannada Sahitya Sammelana held at Belgaum.
 Worked as District Correspondent for Udayavani 'Daily’, Manipal; ‘Vishal Karnataka’, Hubli; ‘Navanadu Daily’, Hubli; ‘Gomantak Times’, Goa; and Jwalamukhi Daily’, Bangalore.
 Secretary, Regional Committee, Belgaum; First World Konkani Sammelan  held at Mangalore in 1995.
and many more...

References

People from Udupi district
Journalists from Karnataka
Konkani people
1940 births
2015 deaths